Zuph means honeycomb in Hebrew

 According to the Books of Chronicles, a Kohathite Levite, a fact not mentioned in the books of Samuel.
 Land of Zuph, a district in which lay Samuel's city, Ramathaim-Zophim. It was probably so named after Zuph. Zuph and the city of Ramathaim-Zophim are mentioned in the Bible together with Mount Ephraim, suggesting that they shared a similar locality.

References

}

Books of Samuel people
Hebrew Bible places
Books of Chronicles people